Pramadea lunalis is a moth in the family Crambidae. It was described by Achille Guenée in 1854. It is found in Taiwan, India, Sri Lanka, Myanmar, Borneo, Sulawesi, Sumbawa and Java. It is also found in Australia, where it has been recorded from the Northern Territory and Queensland.

References

Moths described in 1854
Moths of Asia
Moths of Australia
Spilomelinae
Taxa named by Achille Guenée